Linköpings SF Water Polo Team, also known as LSF, is a water polo club based in Linköping, Östergötland, Sweden. LSF was formed on 19 November 2009 after a split from the swimming club, LASS. LSF's colours are white, blue and orange. The club is currently playing in, Elitserien (vattenpolo), which is the highest water polo league in Sweden. 14 May 2016, LSF became for the first time, in the history of the club, the Swedish Champion in Elitserien (vattenpolo), after beating Polisen with 8-3 in the final game. Season (2014/2015), LSF finished at a second place after losing the final, towards Järfälla, by 10-13.

Arena 

LSF plays their home matches at Tinnerbäcksbadet, Linköping.

Current squad 

The team roster for 2016/2017 season

     (Head coach)  Ervin Babic

Achievements 

 Elitserien (vattenpolo):
 Winners (1): 2016
 Runners-up (2): 2013, 2015
 The Swedish Championships in Beach Water Polo:
 Winners (3): 2014, 2015, 2016
 Runners-up (1): 2013

Records 

 Largest league victory: 32-5 v SKK, 23-01-2016
 Most goals scored from one player in the same game: 8 goals, Henrik Palm, v KSS, 12-12-2015
 Most goals scored in one season: 43 goals, Henrik Palm, season 2015/2016

External links 

 https://www.facebook.com/lsfpolo/
 http://www.svenskalag.se/lsf/

References 

Water polo clubs in Sweden